John Edward André (January 3, 1923 – November 25, 1976) was a Major League Baseball pitcher for the Chicago Cubs in the 1955 season. Born in Brockton, Massachusetts, the Filipino-American André was signed by the New York Giants as an amateur free agent in 1946. He languished in the minor leagues for years before being purchased by the Cubs from a club in Shreveport. André made his major league debut at the unusually advanced age of 32 on April 16, 1955, and went on to appear in 22 games, including 3 starts. He managed a record of just 0–1 with one save in those 22 games, posting a 5.80 ERA. André's final major league game was on July 16, 1955.

André died in Centerville, Massachusetts.

External links

Pura Pelota

1923 births
1976 deaths
American baseball players of Filipino descent
Austin Pioneers players
Baseball players from Massachusetts
Chicago Cubs players
Danville Leafs players
Des Moines Bruins players
Granby Red Sox players
Licoreros de Pampero players
Los Angeles Angels (minor league) players
Major League Baseball pitchers
Minot Mallards players
Navegantes del Magallanes players
Rehoboth Beach Sea Hawks players
Seaford Eagles players
Shreveport Sports players
Sportspeople from Brockton, Massachusetts
Trenton Giants players
Tulsa Oilers (baseball) players
Wilmington Blue Rocks (1940–1952) players
American expatriate baseball players in Venezuela